Dotnuva (formerly ,) is a small town with a 2003 population of 775 in central Lithuania, 10 km northwest of Kėdainiai, in the Kėdainiai district municipality. It is located on the Dotnuvėlė River. The geographical center of Lithuania, in the village of Ruoščiai is only a few kilometers away from the town. There is a Catholic church, former Bernardine monastery, former sawmill and watermill in Dotnuva. The Dotnuva manor is in the nearby town Akademija.

Dotnuva is an important center of agriculture.

History

The first mention of the name Dotnuva was in 1372. The Dotnuva estate was known from the 16th century. In 1636 the first wooden church was built. The Brzostowski family, the owners of surrounding land and town, invited Bernardines from Vilnius and in 1701, a Bernardine monastery was established in the town. The monastery was begun to be built in 1768 and the church in 1773–1810. This monastery also kept the primary school similar to the other Bernardine monasteries. The school was opened in 1796 and in beginning of the 19th century grew to the level of high school (gymnasium). But as the monks got involved in the 1831 Uprising against Russian rule, the school was closed in 1836.

The town has a long history of farming education. In 1911-1914 Pyotr Stolypin founded the farming school in the old estate. A new building for this school was built (destroyed in 1944). In 1924 Dotnuva Agricultural College was founded in Dotnuva estate, these days called Akademija. On 26 February 1947, the first kolkhoz in Lithuania – the Marytės Melninkaitės kolūkis – was established nearby.

From 1956 till 1996 Dotnuva held the status of city but later was declared as a town.

Demography

References

External links

 The monastery in Dotnuva

Kėdainiai District Municipality
Towns in Lithuania
Towns in Kaunas County